Harry S. Truman (1884–1972) was a U.S. Senator from Missouri from 1935 to 1945. Senator Truman may also refer to:

James S. Truman (1874–1957), New York State Senate
Lyman Truman (1806–1881), New York State Senate